Júlio Estevão Alves de Melo (born 3 November 1994), commonly known as Júlio Alves, is a Brazilian footballer who currently plays as a forward for Sport Benfica e Castelo Branco.

Career statistics

Club

Notes

References

1994 births
Living people
Brazilian footballers
Brazilian expatriate footballers
Association football forwards
Campeonato Brasileiro Série C players
Campeonato Brasileiro Série D players
Liga Portugal 2 players
Campeonato de Portugal (league) players
Salgueiro Atlético Clube players
Cuiabá Esporte Clube players
Mirassol Futebol Clube players
São Carlos Futebol Clube players
Varzim S.C. players
Lusitânia F.C. players
S.C. Olhanense players
Sport Benfica e Castelo Branco players
Brazilian expatriate sportspeople in Portugal
Expatriate footballers in Portugal